Homemade may refer to:

Handicraft, things that are made by hand
Homemade, T4 TV series 2006
HomeMADE, Australian reality TV series 2009
Homemade TV, a Canadian children's television series  1976 to 1977
Homemade (album), by The Osmonds 1971
Homemade, album by Cephas & Wiggins 1999
Home Made (1927 film), an American silent comedy film
 Home Made (2017 film), an Israeli short film
Homemade (TV series), an Italian-Chilean anthology series
"Homemade" (song), a 2019 song by Jake Owen

See also
Homemade leverage, use of personal borrowing of investors to change the amount of financial leverage of a firm